The Anarchist Cookbook, first published in 1971, is a book containing instructions for the manufacture of explosives, rudimentary telecommunications phreaking devices, and related weapons, as well as instructions for the home manufacture of illicit drugs, including LSD. It was written by William Powell at the apex of the counterculture era to protest against United States's involvement in the Vietnam War. Powell converted to Anglicanism in 1976 and later attempted to have the book removed from circulation. However, the copyright belonged to the publisher, who continued circulation until the company was acquired in 1991. Its legality has been questioned in several jurisdictions.

History

Creation 
The Anarchist Cookbook was written by William Powell as a teenager and first published in 1971 at the apex of the counterculture era to protest against United States involvement in the Vietnam War. Powell gained inspiration for his text from his experiences with Vietnam veterans throughout his time living in New York City, during which, the pacifist movements of the 1960s began to take a more violent turn, having been responsible for over 100 politically inspired bombings. Powell began plans to become a writer but decided upon a political course when he was drafted into the Vietnam war, which inspired him to write "recipes" and later compile them into a "cookbook". The initial vision of The Anarchist Cookbook was to post instructional flyers in New York City, including how to properly throw a Molotov cocktail and how to make LSD. These "recipes" were eventually adapted to make up an entire book. From 1968 to 1970, Powell began researching in the "U.S. Combat Bookshelf" at the New York Public Library, including mainstream external texts such as The Boy Scout Handbook, and anarchist texts like Fuck the System by Abbie Hoffman. The initial manuscript was sent to Lyle Stuart in 1970.

Powell stated The Anarchist Cookbook was initially designed as a book meant to provide education to "the silent majority" of the American population. He described that the book was not intended for extant political fringe organizations but was designed to galvanize a great societal change by inciting the general population. The ultimate goal of the text was to provide the general population with the skills and capabilities to organize against fascist, capitalist, and communist threats that he perceived. Powell stated: "The central idea to the book was that violence is an acceptable means to bring about political change," a sentiment that he would renounce later in life.

Author's remorse 

After writing the book as a teenager, Powell converted to Anglicanism in 1976 and later attempted to have the book removed from circulation. In 1979, Powell left the United States, traveling to the Middle East, Africa, and parts of Asia. He worked as a faculty member for international schools backed by the United States. During this time, he began writing about pedagogy and conflict resolution. This led him to renounce his book and instead campaign for its withdrawal from publication. He was unable to legally stop the publication of The Anarchist's Cookbook because the copyright had been issued to the original publisher (Lyle Stuart), and subsequent publishers that purchased the rights have kept the title in print. Powell publicly renounced his book in a 2013 piece calling for the book to "quickly and quietly go out of print". Having written the book, Powell had difficulty finding employment throughout his life, having described the book as "a youthful indiscretion or mistake that can haunt someone during their early years or even longer." In 2011, Powell and his wife, Ochan Kusuma-Powell, founded Next Frontier: Inclusion, a nonprofit serving children with developmental disabilities and learning disabilities, describing it as a means to atone for writing the text. William Powell died of cardiac arrest on 11 July 2016.

Publication status 
Powell originally sent the manuscript to over 30 publishers until Lyle Stuart bought the book and its copyright. Powell received royalties for the book, approximately $35,000 until he split with the company in 1976. Despite Powell's protest against the continued publication of the text, the copyright of the book never belonged to its author, but to its publisher Lyle Stuart. The publisher Lyle Stuart, Inc. agreed to publish the text as an attempt to defy efforts by the Central Intelligence Agency (CIA) and Federal Bureau of Investigation (FBI) to obtain lists of people who checked out books that were deemed subversive. Stuart kept publishing the book until the company was bought in 1991 by Steven Schragis, who decided to drop it. Out of the 2,000 books published by the company, it was the only one that Schragis decided to stop publishing. Schragis said publishers have a responsibility to the public, and the book had no positive social purpose that could justify keeping it in print. The copyright was bought in 2002 by Delta Press (aka Ozark Press) an Arkansas-based publisher that specializes in controversial books, where the title is their "most-asked-for volume". As of 2016, over two million copies of the book have been sold.

Content summary

Foreword 
The Anarchist Cookbook begins with a Foreword section, detailing the author's intentions for the text. At the time of writing, Powell believed that the United States was slowly declining towards communism, thus he found it necessary to write a book that guided people on revolution against this transition. He championed the idea of "bringing America back to where she was two hundred years ago", believing his revolutionary ideals to be reactionary, rather than proactive. Powell begins with his vision for the book in how it is intended to educate and galvanize the public to make tangible change in their home countries. Powell states that fringe political organizations, such The Minutemen and The Weathermen, are not the intended audience, rather it is written for "the silent majority". Powell envisioned the United States people rebelling against what he deemed to be oppressive capitalistic ideals, and to a lesser extent, against fascist and communist movements.

Content 
Powell begins the content of his book by discussing anarchy and anarchist theory. Anarchy, by his definition, is a wide-scale mass uprising by the people, similar to that of civil disobedience through violence. He believed that anarchy was the innate state of all individuals, and therefore human nature would drive people to participate in such practices. Powell believed that current expressions of politics, arts, music, and education all contained innate principles of anarchist ideals, thereby equating anarchism to individualism. This principle drives Powell's argumentation as he believed that the current political climate and the Vietnam war had undermined human values, therefore revolution based upon his perception of human dignity and freedom was what drove him to write the piece. He ends his introduction by warning of the seriousness that these recipes may have deadly consequences if used improperly. The chapters of The Anarchist Cookbook include descriptions and detailed instructions in hand-to-hand combat, explosives, booby traps, drugs, tear gas, sabotage and demolition, surveillance, improvised weapons, and other topics related to anarchism.

Reception

Legal reviews 
At the time of its publication, one FBI memo described The Anarchist Cookbook as "one of the crudest, low-brow, paranoiac writing efforts ever attempted". The book was reviewed by the Department of Justice, the White House, the FBI, and by both John Dean and Mark Felt, Richard Nixon's lawyer, and FBI Director J. Edgar Hoover's associate director respectively. While having concerns about the text, the FBI concluded that it could not be regulated as it was published through mass media. Furthermore, the FBI ruled that The Anarchist Cookbook does not incite "forcible resistance to any law of the United States" and is therefore protected under the First Amendment. While much of the text was deemed to be inaccurate, the FBI concluded that the chapter on explosives "appears to be accurate in most respects". Since its conception, the FBI has kept records of the book, releasing the bulk of its investigation file in 2010.

Anarchism 
The anarchist collective CrimethInc., which published the book Recipes for Disaster: An Anarchist Cookbook in response, denounces the earlier book, saying it was "not composed or released by anarchists, not derived from anarchist practice, not intended to promote freedom and autonomy or challenge repressive power – and was barely a cookbook, as most of the recipes in it are notoriously unreliable".

Media presence

Internet/media 

Much of the publication was copied and made available as text documents online through Usenet and FTP sites hosted in academic institutions in the early 1990s, and has been made available via web browsers from their inception in the mid-1990s to the present day. The name varies slightly from Anarchist Cookbook to Anarchy Cookbook and the topics have expanded vastly in the intervening decades. Many of the articles were attributed to an anonymous author called "The Jolly Roger".

Knowledge of the book, or copied online publications of it, increased along with the increase in public access to the Internet throughout the mid-1990s. Newspapers ran stories about how easy the text was to get hold of, and the influence it may have had with terrorists, criminals, and experimenting teenagers.

Film 

The book served as a central element of the 2002 romantic comedy The Anarchist Cookbook. Repercussions from the book's publication, and the author's subsequent disavowal of its content, were the subject of the 2016 documentary film American Anarchist by Charlie Siskel. In the film, William Powell explains in depth his thoughts on the book and the consequences it had in his life. It further explores the themes of responsibility and repercussions that decision can have on one's life. Powell's death in 2016 received little media coverage until the release of American Anarchist, which was released a few months after his death.

Notable incidents of alleged use and attempts to suppress 

 1976: Police linked the bombing of Grand Central Terminal and hijacking of a TWA flight to Croatian radicals who used instructions from The Anarchist Cookbook.
 1981: The Anarchist Cookbook was linked to Puerto Rican rebels who bombed an FBI headquarters using the book's directions. Thomas Spinks also referred to the text during the bombings of 10 abortion clinics in the United States.
 1995: The perpetrators of the Oklahoma City bombing were alleged to have used directions from the book.
 1999: Police found The Anarchist Cookbook in the possession of the Columbine High School shooters Eric Harris and Dylan Klebold, in Littleton, Colorado; it may have inspired them.
 2002: The Canadian government permitted the book to be imported from the United States. Canada Customs and Revenue Agency concluded the book does not violate either hate or obscenity laws, therefore the previous ban on the text was resolved.
 2007: A 17-year-old was arrested in the United Kingdom and faced charges under anti-terrorism law in the UK for possession of The Anarchists' Cookbook. He was cleared of all charges in October 2008, after arguing that he was a prankster who just wanted to research fireworks and smoke bombs.
 2010: In County Durham, UK, Ian Davison and his son were imprisoned under anti-terrorism laws for the manufacturing of ricin. Their possession of The Anarchist Cookbook, along with its availability, was noted by the authorities. This led to a London judge and police campaigning to have the book banned in the UK.
 2012: The Anarchist Cookbook was found to have been in the possession of  James Holmes, the perpetrator of the Aurora theater shooting in Colorado, USA.
 2013: Renewed calls were made in the United States to ban the book, citing links to a school shooting in Arapahoe, Colorado, and the 2013 Santa Monica shootings by Karl Pierson.
 2015: The London public-transport bombers were linked to the book.
 2015: U.S. Senator Dianne Feinstein pushed to have the book removed from online databases.
 2016: The book was refused classification by the Office of Film and Literature Classification upon release, thus making the book banned in Australia. It was classified RC again on 31 October 2016.
 2017: A 27-year-old was prosecuted in the UK solely for the possession of the book. He was found not guilty.
 2020: A 23-year-old mathematics graduate of the University of Cambridge was convicted of 'collecting information useful to a person committing or preparing an act of terrorism' based on his possession of the book after posting on Facebook that he wanted to "go on a killing spree".
 2021: Ben John, a 21-year-old student, was found guilty of possessing a copy of the book on a computer hard drive, where he was given a suspended sentence and told by a UK judge to 'read classical literature', such as Pride and Prejudice; only for the Court of Appeal to rule that order unlawful, sentencing the man to three years: two years in custody, one year on licence.

See also 
 The Big Book of Mischief
 The Poor Man's James Bond
 Rules for Radicals
 Johann Most, author of Science of Revolutionary Warfare, an inspiration of this Cookbook according to the forewords
 Keith McHenry, who wrote a parody of this book focusing on food mutual aid in 2015

References

Further reading

External links 

 
 

1971 non-fiction books
American non-fiction books
Censored books
English-language books